The Shohada Stadium is a multi-purpose stadium in Noshahr, Iran.  It is currently used mostly for football matches and is the home stadium of Shemushack Noshahr F.C. in the Azadegan League.  The stadium holds 6,000 people. 
There was an incident in this stadium in the match against Persepolis in the Hazfi Cup in 2003 in which some of the seats fell down. Two people died, and Persepolis withdrew from the competition.

References

Football venues in Iran
Multi-purpose stadiums in Iran
Buildings and structures in Mazandaran Province
Sport in Mazandaran Province